Impressions is an album by American jazz pianist Mal Waldron, recorded in 1959 and released on the New Jazz label.

Reception
A contemporaneous review by the New Pittsburgh Courier stated that it was Waldron's "best trio offering to date" and "definitely of five-star calibre"
The Allmusic review by Scott Yanow awarded the album 4 stars, stating "Waldron's brooding Monk-influenced style is heard in its early prime on this excellent release".

Track listing
All compositions by Mal Waldron except as indicated
 "Les Champs Elysées" – 6:22
 "C'est Formidable" – 4:04
 "Ciao" – 9:55
 "You Stepped Out of a Dream" (Nacio Herb Brown, Gus Kahn) – 5:47
 "All the Way" (Sammy Cahn, Jimmy Van Heusen) – 6:38
 "All About Us" (Elaine Waldron) – 5:02
 "With a Song in My Heart" (Lorenz Hart, Richard Rodgers) – 3:40

Personnel
 Mal Waldron – piano
 Addison Farmer – bass
 Albert Heath – drums

References

New Jazz Records albums
Mal Waldron albums
1959 albums
Albums recorded at Van Gelder Studio